Frank Buckley "Bucky" Pope (born March 23, 1941 in Pittsburgh, Pennsylvania) is a former professional American football wide receiver in the NFL for the Los Angeles Rams and the Green Bay Packers. He is mostly known for his 1964 season and nickname,"The Catawba Claw." The 31.44 yards he gained per reception that year is the second-highest for a season in NFL history.  After his stellar rookie season his career was derailed due to injuries. He missed all of the 1965 season then played only 3 more years.

Catawba College 
Bucky was recruited to play basketball at Duke University but did not persist there due to grades. After that experience he became a two sport star at nearby Catawba College (1962-1963), originally recruited for basketball he also made his mark on the football field. In basketball, he averaged 19.4 points in 61 games and in two seasons playing football caught 66 passes for nearly 1,200 yards.

References

1941 births
Living people
Sportspeople from Pennsylvania
American football wide receivers
Catawba Indians football players
Catawba Indians men's basketball players
Los Angeles Rams players
Green Bay Packers players
American men's basketball players